(born Tokyo 16 March 1962) is a former Japanese rugby union player. He played as a wing

Career
After attending Nippon Sports Science University and graduating, Onuki started to play for Suntory in the All-Japan Rugby Company Championship, with which he played his entire career. His first international cap for Japan was in a match against France, at Osaka, on 30 September 1984. He was also part of the 1987 Rugby World Cup squad, where he played two matches, with his last cap being the pool stage match against England, at Sydney, on 30 May 1987, earning 15 international caps.

Notes

External links
Shinji Onuki international stats

1962 births
Living people
Rugby union wings
Japanese rugby union players
Japan international rugby union players
Tokyo Sungoliath players
Sportspeople from Tokyo